In theoretical physics, the Scherk–Schwarz mechanism (named after Joël Scherk and John Henry Schwarz) for a field φ basically means that φ is a section of a non-trivializable fiber bundle (not necessarily a vector bundle since φ needn't be linear) which is fixed by the model. This is called a twist by physicists.

Note that this can never occur in a spacetime which is homeomorphic to Rn, which is a contractible space. 
However, for Kaluza–Klein theories, the Scherk–Schwarz mechanism is a possibility which can't be neglected.
 
Particle physics